Discothèque is the eleventh studio album by Australian singer Marcia Hines, released in Australia on 30 September 2006 (see 2006 in music). It peaked at #6 in Australia.

Singles
Hines released two singles from the album:
"Disco Inferno" 
"Stomp!" featuring Deni Hines - #43 Australian ARIA Charts

Track listing
CD 
 "Disco Inferno" (Leroy Green, Ron Kersey) – 3:49 
 "Never Knew Love Like This Before" (James Mtume, Reggie Lucas) – 4:52 
 "Stomp!" featuring Deni Hines – 4:26
 "Right Back Where We Started From" – 3:14
 "The Best of My Love" – 3:58
 "You Should Be Dancing" – 4:12 (Barry Gibb, Robin Gibb, Maurice Gibb)
 "Shake Your Groove Thing" – 3:29
 "Never Can Say Goodbye" – 3:04
 "Last Dance" – 4:26
 "I Can't Stand the Rain" (Ann Peebles, Donald Bryant, Bernard Miller) – 3:10
 "You to Me Are Everything" – 3:24
 "Blame It on the Boogie" – 3:50 (Mick Jackson, Elmar Krohn, David Jackson)
 "Let's Groove" – 4:13
 "I'm Coming Out" (Bernard Edwards, Nile Rodgers) – 3:26

CD Tour Edition (released December 2007) 
 "You" - (2005 Remix Edit)
 "Your Love Still Brings Me to My Knees"
 "Stomp" - (Smash N Grab Club Mix)
 "Disco Inferno" - (David Konsky Radio Edit)

Personnel 

Ian Bell – trombone
Jessica Bell – violin
Roger Blayden – design assistant
Paul Bushnell – bass
Kieran Conrau – trombone
Warren Costello – executive producer
Jim Cox – keyboards
Paula Reid - backing vocals
Tania Doko – backing vocals
Richie Gajate Garcia – percussion
Shane Gillard – trumpet
Cameron Hill – violin
Rachel Homburg – violin
Edwina Hookey – violin
Hannah Hookey – string coordinator
Helen Ireland – viola
Jeff Jenkins – sleeve notes
Christina Katsimbardis – violin
Kylie Liang – violin
Brian McCloud – drums
Gary Pinto – backing vocals
Forrester Savell – bass engineer, drum engineering
Gregg Spence – trumpet
Kristian Vidakovic – guitar
Paul L. Wiltshire – arranger, keyboards, backing vocals), producer, mixing
Jonathan Wong – violin
Victoria Wu – producer, vocal editing
Leon Zervos – mastering

Charts
"Discothèque" debuted/peaked on the ARIA charts at #6. It stayed in the chart for over 2 months.

Weekly charts

Year-end charts

Certifications

References

2006 albums
Marcia Hines albums
Warner Music Group albums
Covers albums